Brandon Semenuk is a Canadian freeride mountain biker and rally racer from Whistler, British Columbia. Semenuk is a three-time Freeride Mountain Bike World Tour Gold Medalist. He is a five-time Red Bull Joyride winner, X-Games Real MTB Gold Medalist (2021), and X-Games Silver medalist (2013) in the Mountain Bike Slopestyle event. He is the 2022 American Rally Association presented by Dirtfish National Champion. Red Bull Rampage winner; 2008, 2016, 2019 and 2021 -  the 1st person to win Rampage four-times. He is known to be "always emulated, never imitated" and is known as one of the best slopestyle/freeride mountain bikers in history.

Early life and early career
Semenuk grew up in Whistler, British Columbia, where he started out in cross-country cycling, competing in the BC Cup for the first time at the age of 9. He also competed in Four-Cross early in his career. At the age of 15, while riding his local jumps, Semenuk's talent was spotted by Andrew Shandro. Shortly thereafter, Shandro offered Semenuk a professional contract with Trek

Career
He won silver in Slopestyle at the X-Games Munich in 2013. He won the Red Bull Joyride in 2011, and also in 2013, 2014, 2015  and 2017, and is a four-time Redbull Rampage winner, being the only athlete to accomplish this feat. For the 2015 mountain bike movie unReal, he was filmed in a one shot segment that went viral on the internet. Semenuk has also been interested in rally driving since a young age, and as of April 2020, was welcomed to the Subaru Motorsports rally team alongside Travis Pastrana.  He earned his first professional rally win on 5 October 2020, at the Missouri Show-Me Rally. On 15 October 2022 he became the 2022 American Rally Association presented by Dirtfish National Champion.

Notes

References

Living people
Canadian mountain bikers
Canadian male cyclists
1991 births
Freeride mountain bikers